Hlarkada is a village in the Kayin State of southern Myanmar. It lies on the eastern bank of the Winyaw River about two kilometres.

Notes

External links
"Hlarkada Map — Satellite Images of Hlarkada" Maplandia World Gazetteer

Populated places in Kayin State

.